Asphodel can refer to:

Plants
The genus Asphodelus
 Members of several botanical genera, especially:
 Asphodelus aestivus, Mediterranean basin
 Asphodelus albus
 Asphodelus ramosus
 Asphodeline lutea, the yellow asphodel
 Narthecium ossifragum, the bog asphodel (Western Europe)
 Narthecium americanum, the bog asphodel (US)
 Triantha, the False asphodel, a genus of four species in Japan and North America

Other uses
 Asphodel, a novel by H.D., written 1921–1922, published 1992
 Asphodel, a novel by Mary Elizabeth Braddon, (1881)
 Asphodel Records, AKA Asphodel Ltd., San Francisco based record label
 Asphodel Meadows, a section of the Underworld in ancient Greek mythology
 Asphodel-Norwood, Ontario, a Canadian municipality which includes the former Asphodel Township